Latifa Essarokh (born 11 December 1973) is a French middle-distance runner. She competed in the women's 1500 metres event at the 2004 Summer Olympics.

References

External links

1973 births
Living people
French female middle-distance runners
Sportspeople from Marrakesh
Athletes (track and field) at the 2004 Summer Olympics
Olympic athletes of France